Initial Group C of the 1998 Fed Cup Asia/Oceania Zone Group II was one of six pools in the Asia/Oceania Zone Group II of the 1998 Fed Cup. Three teams competed in a round robin competition with the team coming first advancing to Placement Pool A, the team coming second going to Placement Pool B, and the team coming last falling to Placement Pool C.

Tajikistan vs. Syria

Tajikistan vs. Kazakhstan

Kazakhstan vs. Syria

See also
Fed Cup structure

References

External links
 Fed Cup website

1998 Fed Cup Asia/Oceania Zone